Stefan Torssell (born 1946) is a Swedish sea captain, author, lecturer, politician, and reporter known for his book "M/S Estonia - svenska statens haveri" which purports to reveal controversial information about the Swedish governmental cover up of the about the MS Estonia sinking. He also gave an interview about the book in Swebbtv. Torssell is a writer at Nya Tider and identifies himself as a soft nationalist and patriot.

Background 
Torssell became a sailor at the age of 15 and graduated as a sea captain. In his youth, he became a member of the Centre Party and later as one of the founders of Green Party in 1981. He left the party quickly with the motivation that they had a large distance to ordinary Swede. Today he believes that both the Green Party and Left Party are opportunistic. According to Torssell, after the Swedish political establishment seized to serve the Swedish public he became a patriot and a soft nationalist. He was a writer at Avpixlat, but left the agency in the election of 2014 due to their political agenda. He continued as a columnist at Nya Tider which he believes is more liberal. He published five articles about MS Estonia.

MS Estonia 
On September 27, 1994, MS Estonia left Tallinn with 989 passengers on board and in the night it wrecked in the Baltic Sea. Shortly after the incident, Stefan Torssell was hired at the Swedish Maritime Administration and met the victims families and began investigating the event on his spare time. After publishing his book "M/S Estonia: svenska statens haveri" Torssell eventually participated in an interview with Swebbtv where he criticized the Swedish Government who at the time of the incident, in 1994, failed to respond properly to the emergency. Torssell states in his book, transcribed from the audio recordings of the radio, that a large bang was heard and that the captain sounded an SOS-alarm to the Swedish and Finnish authorities that the ship was sinking. Torssell has hypothesized that the then Prime Minister Carl Bildt knew that Russian arms were on board, and that retrieving the ship would uncover possible secret and political scandals and chose to label it as an accident. In 2015, Stefan Torssell arranged a lecture where he stated that after 15 hours of emergency, Carl Bildt stated that the reason of the wreck of Estonia was a "design flaw" on the side. The committee he arranged for the investigation confirmed his theory. The Swedish government, with Mona Sahlin, chose to give the situation a "grave peace agreement" (gravfrid in Swedish) resulting in the errand being closed due to respect of the victims family members. The incident of Estonia has never been investigated publicly by a third party actor despite the United Nations resolution IMO A.849(20) about international sea crash investigations in paragraf 13 which states that all investigation must be re-opened against when new evidence are presented which opposes previous conclusion. According to Henning Witte, a German-Swedish attorney who ran a special investigation of the incident, the ship was sunk as a result of an attack and Swedish authorities sought to cover it up. The investigation of Witte was supported by the families of the victims and survivors however the chief of Swedish committee investigating Estonia, Ann-Louise Eksborg, opposed any new evidence which contradicted the official theory. Expressen published an article in 2008 by Torssell where he, along other deputies and reporters co-authoring, states that the public investigation of Estonia has been halted through oblivion, gags, pressure from state executives, classified reports, destroyed documents, edited records, video recordings and absence of responsibility.

Politics 
Stefan Torssell has criticized Alternative for Sweden (AfS) for their neutrality in the Palestina-Israel situation. In April 2019 Torssell became elected as the party leader of Landsbygdspartiet Oberoende (LPO).

References 

Living people
1946 births
Sea captains
Swedish journalists
21st-century Swedish politicians
Date of birth missing (living people)